Carlos de la Madrid Virgen (24 May 1940 – 26 August 2014) was a Mexican lawyer and politician affiliated with the Institutional Revolutionary Party, he was Governor of Colima from 1991 to 1997 and also served as Mayor of Colima, Colima until 1991, when he was appointed to the Governature.

References

1940 births
2014 deaths
Politicians from Colima City
20th-century Mexican lawyers
Governors of Colima
Institutional Revolutionary Party politicians